Lilawadee Plerng, also written as Leelawadee Plerng (lit: Fire Plumeria; English title: The Secret Truth) is Thai TV dramas or lakorn aired on Channel 7 from January 3 to February 8, 2015 on Fridays, Saturdays and Sundays at 20:30  for 17 episodes.

Summary
The only daughter of the man who killed his mom asks him to help prove the innocence of her dad. Thiwit was the only witness to the killing of his mom by her ex-lover. But he was knocked out from a blow to the head and couldn't remember anything that happened that day. The only evidence that tied Linn's father to the crime was a red plumeria (a lilawadee flower in Thai language). She took on the alias, "Lilawadee Plerng" and works as a nightclub singer in order to investigate the truth so she can clear her dad's name from the crime he didn't commit. The case was a long time ago when she and he was little. Thiwit wanted to chase Lilawadee away but there's something about her that make him want to help her prove the truth. Find out to see who was the real killer.

Cast

Awards and nominations

References

External links
  

Thai television soap operas
2015 Thai television series debuts
2015 Thai television series endings
Thai mystery television series
Channel 7 (Thailand) original programming